The Mephisto Waltz is a 1971 American horror film about an occult-murder mystery. It was directed by Paul Wendkos and starred Alan Alda, Jacqueline Bisset, Barbara Parkins, Bradford Dillman and Curt Jürgens. The name of the film is taken from the piano work by Franz Liszt of the same title (see Mephisto Waltzes). Ben Maddow adapted his screenplay from the novel of the same title by Fred Mustard Stewart. The film was the only big-screen work of veteran television producer Quinn Martin.

Plot
Myles Clarkson, long ago frustrated in his hope for a career as a concert pianist, is now a music journalist and interviews Duncan Ely, perhaps the world's greatest piano virtuoso.  At first annoyed by Myles' presence, Duncan notices that Myles' hands seem perfect for the piano.  From that point, Duncan and his adult daughter, Roxanne, strongly pursue a friendship with Myles and wife Paula.

Paula does not much like Duncan and especially dislikes Roxanne. While Paula is disturbed by the level of attention being paid to them, Myles is honored to be considered a friend by Duncan, who is dying of leukemia. Unbeknownst to them, Duncan and Roxanne are Satanists. As Duncan's physical body nears its end, father and daughter perform an occult ritual that transfers Duncan's consciousness into Myles' body while  Myles’ consciousness is transferred into the body of Duncan as he dies.

Myles' ensuing change in personality, which includes his now being able to play the piano as well as had Duncan, is noticed by Paula, but she is initially unsuspecting of the cause. Though confused by the change in her husband, she also finds his new persona exciting and attractive.  Myles soon is pursuing a career as a pianist and is so successful that he is able to take over Duncan's concert schedule.

Paula has a nightmare in which she envisions Duncan telling her that he must kill Abby, her and Myles' young daughter. Duncan tells her that he does not want to harm the girl, but that his Master has insisted upon it as "part of the bargain". Immediately after the dream, in which a blue substance is placed on Abby's forehead, Paula finds the blue substance actually on her daughter's skin. Abby gets ill and dies.

Abby's death sparks in Paula a further suspicion of Roxanne. As Myles seems to drift away from her into his new career, Paula investigates Roxanne's background. This includes visiting Roxanne's ex-husband, Bill, and a romantic relationship begins to form between the two. Paula eventually becomes convinced that Duncan and Roxanne struck a deal with Satan to enable them to pursue an incestuous relationship, that they have placed Duncan's consciousness into her husband's body, and that they are responsible for Abby's death.

Paula falls asleep and Bill dies in an apparent accident, though he too has the blue substance on his forehead. Paula nearly meets a similar "accidental" fate, which leaves her certain that Roxanne and Duncan (in Myles' body) killed Bill, and fearful that they will try to eliminate her. She resolves that, regardless of who is inhabiting her husband's body, she wants to be with that man.

As a result, she turns to Satanism and strikes her own bargain with the Devil. She then attacks Roxanne, knocks her unconscious, and employs the same dark magic that Duncan and Roxanne had used against Myles.  Paula transfers her own consciousness into Roxanne's body, leaving her own body dead in the bath, an apparent suicide.

In Roxanne's body, Paula returns to Duncan/Myles, who happily informs her of Paula's suicide.  Without telling him who she really is, she embraces him, enthralled with the excitement of the beginning of their new relationship.

Cast

Production
Exteriors were shot on location along the Pacific coast in California; the book took place in New York City. The film, which was a Quinn Martin Production, was originally given a cinematic release by 20th Century-Fox.

Reception
The film was noted for its stylistic imagery and soundtrack by Jerry Goldsmith. All Movie Guide noted Alan Alda's performance as the film's only weak point, praising the "offbeat cinematography", "truly shocking setpieces", and Jacqueline Bisset's "chillingly effective" performance, stating that these elements build a pervading sensation of doom.

Noted film critic Roger Ebert gave the movie 2 stars, commenting:If a horror movie is to be taken seriously, it has to pretend to take horror seriously. And this one doesn't. It reduces magic to a simpleminded ritual that anyone can perform: all our heroine has to do is steal some funny blue stuff and read pig Latin out of a book. The magic works for her, too.
...
The casting (Alan Alda, Jacqueline Bisset, Barbara Parkins, Curt Jurgens) is expensive, and so is the production. But you get the notion that the people who made the film didn't take magic seriously enough. I don't mean they should believe in it; but they should have made a film that pretended to.

Soundtrack
Varèse Sarabande issued an album of Jerry Goldsmith's score in 1997, paired with a suite from his score for The Other.

 Twentieth Century Fox Fanfare, 1953 version – Alfred Newman (:14)
 Main Title (2:27)
 The Library (1:38)
 A New Miles (5:12)
 The Funeral (3:26)
 A Night In Mexico (2:16)
 Part Of The Bargain (3:41)
 The Hospital (2:18)
 The Latest Victim (5:14)
 Dogfight (2:07)
 Roxanne's Demise (1:37)
 End Title (3:45)
 The Other: Suite (22:02)

See also
 List of American films of 1971

References

Further reading
Schreck, Nikolas. The Satanic Screen: An Illustrated Guide to the Devil in Cinema. London: Creation Books, 2001, pp. 156–57.

External links
 
  
 
 
 

1971 films
1971 horror films
20th Century Fox films
American supernatural horror films
Body swapping in films
Films scored by Jerry Goldsmith
Films about pianos and pianists
Films based on American horror novels
Films directed by Paul Wendkos
Films set in Los Angeles
Films about Satanism
Films about witchcraft
Films about cancer
Incest in film
1970s English-language films
1970s American films